This page provides the summaries of the matches of the qualifying rounds for the group stage of the 2010 CONCACAF Women's World Cup Qualifying tournament.  These matches also served as part of the qualifiers for the 2011 FIFA Women's World Cup that was held in Germany.

A total of 23 national teams entered qualification – 6 in the Central American (UNCAF) region and 17 in the Caribbean (CFU) region.  Two Central American and three Caribbean sides advanced to the 2010 CONCACAF Women's Championship, joining three pre-qualified teams of North American region.

Central America

The winner of each group advanced to the 2010 CONCACAF Women's World Cup Qualifying tournament in late 2010.

Triangular A
All matches played in Antigua Guatemala, Guatemala.

Triangular B
All matches played in Managua, Nicaragua.

Caribbean

First round

Cuba and Trinidad and Tobago received byes to the second round.

The winner of each group advanced, along with the best of the five runners-up.

Group A
All matches played in Georgetown, Guyana.

Group B
All matches played in Bayamón, Puerto Rico.

Group C
All matches played in St. John's, Antigua and Barbuda.

Group D
All matches played in Santo Domingo, Dominican Republic.

Group E
All matches played in Bridgetown, Barbados.

Ranking of group runners-up

Top team advanced to the second round.

Antigua and Barbuda and the Dominican Republic finished equal as best runners-up.  Antigua and Barbuda won the draw taken to break the tie.

Second round

The winner of each group advanced to the 2010 CONCACAF Women's World Cup Qualifying final tournament in late 2010.  The runners-up advanced to a play-off.

Group F
All matches played in Macoya, Trinidad and Tobago.

Group G
All matches played in Marabella, Trinidad and Tobago.

Caribbean play-off

The winner of the play-off advanced to the 2010 CONCACAF Women's World Cup Qualifying final tournament in late 2010.

|}

Guyana won 3 – 2 on aggregate and advanced to the 2010 CONCACAF Women's World Cup Qualifying final tournament

References

External links

Qualification
2011 FIFA Women's World Cup qualification
Qualification tournaments for the 2011 Pan American Games
2010